Events from the year 1988 in Scotland.

Incumbents 

 Secretary of State for Scotland and Keeper of the Great Seal – Malcolm Rifkind

Law officers 
 Lord Advocate – Lord Cameron of Lochbroom
 Solicitor General for Scotland – Peter Fraser

Judiciary 
 Lord President of the Court of Session and Lord Justice General – Lord Emslie
 Lord Justice Clerk – Lord Ross
 Chairman of the Scottish Land Court – Lord Elliott

Events 
 March – Seafield Colliery at Kirkcaldy closes.
 26 April–26 September – Glasgow Garden Festival. Bell's Bridge is built in connection with it.
 21 May – "Sermon on the Mound": Prime Minister Margaret Thatcher, addresses the General Assembly of the Church of Scotland.
 6 July – Piper Alpha oil rig in the North Sea explodes and results in the death of 167 workers.
 7 August – Scotland on Sunday newspaper launched.
 2 November – Housing (Scotland) Act 1988, receives Royal Assent.
 10 November – The Scottish National Party win the Glasgow Govan by-election from Labour with a swing of 33%.
 21 December – Pan Am Flight 103 explodes over the town of Lockerbie, Dumfries and Galloway, and kills a total of 270 people – including all 259 on board. It is believed that the cause of the explosion was a terrorist bomb.

Births 
 7 January – Alan Lowing, footballer
 2 June – Grado (Graeme Stevely), professional wrestler and screen actor
 21 July – Chris Mitchell, footballer (died 2016)
 22 October – Sharon Rooney, actress
 5 December – Omar Raza, actor
 30 December – Leon Jackson, pop singer

Deaths 

 11 February – Marion Crawford, Scottish educator and governess to Princess Margaret and Queen Elizabeth II (born 1909)
 12 April – Harry McShane, socialist (born 1891)
 26 August – Oscar Marzaroli, photographer (born 1933 in Italy)

The Arts 
 August – The Proclaimers release their album Sunshine on Leith with lead single "I'm Gonna Be (500 Miles)".

See also 
 1988 in Northern Ireland

References 

 
Scotland
Years of the 20th century in Scotland
1980s in Scotland